Phra Phiset Phanit, also known as Poc Khun or Wibun Pokmontri, was a member of the Aphaiwong branch of the Cambodian royal family, the brother-in-law of Prime Minister Khuang Aphaiwong of Thailand, and the organizer and leader of the first Khmer Issarak movement founded in 1940 to resist French colonial power in Cambodia.

After the Khmer Issarak movement disintegrated due to internal political differences, Phiset was elected to represent Battambang (Phra Tabong) in the Thai parliament during the administration of his brother-in-law. After Khuang resigned as Prime Minister and Thailand again ceded the western Cambodian provinces back to French Indochina, Phiset and former Khmer Issarak members formed the Khmer National Liberation Committee (KNLC) in 1948 to further armed resistance against French rule of Cambodia. The KNLC attempted to distance itself from the Indochinese Communist Party and purge other leftists from within its own ranks paving the way for Phiset to become Chairman in 1949. However, he was removed from that position less than a year later after being accused of misappropriating money designating for purchasing weapons.

References

Thai people of Khmer descent
Abhaiwongse family
20th-century Cambodian politicians
Members of the 4th House of Representatives of Thailand
Year of birth missing
Year of death missing